Bakkavor Group plc (originally Bakkavör) is an international food manufacturing company specialising in fresh prepared foods. The group's head office is in London, England. Bakkavor operates 46 factory sites in the UK, US and China. It is listed on the London Stock Exchange and is a constituent of the FTSE 250 Index.

History
Bakkavör was founded in 1986 by the two brothers Ágúst and Lýður Guðmundsson to manufacture and export cod roe to Scandinavia. In 1993 the company became the first production company in Iceland to obtain a ISO:9002 certification for quality assurance.

By 1997 the company had expanded into Scandinavian and European markets selling cod and lumpfish roe. By October 2000, Bakkavor had an annual turnover of over 4.5 billion ISK.

They expanded the business by selling convenience foods. The company acquired Katsouris Fresh Foods in 1997, Wine & Dine in 2000 and Geest in 2005. In early 2003, the company sold its Icelandic components to Fram Foods ehf. and began focusing on the UK market. By 2005 the company had over 13,000 employees.

Following the global financial crisis of 2008, Bakkavör became heavily indebted, forcing the Guðmundsson brothers into emergency talks with the company's bondholders.

The founding brothers repurchased a major stake in Bakkavör from their investment company, Exista, in 2009. The company delisted from the NASDAQ OMX in Iceland in 2010 and became a private limited company. Lýður and Ágúst Guðmundsson faced fraud charges in Iceland in 2012 relating to their ownership of Exista.

Between 2013 and 2015 the company simplified its structure, selling its South African operation and a 40% stake in its Italian business later in the year, along with other operations in Continental Europe. The company acquired US prepared foods manufacturer B. Robert's Foods in January 2015.

In January 2016, Bakk AL Holdings Limited, a company owned by Ágúst and Lýður Guðmundsson and funds managed by The Baupost Group, LLC, purchased shares in the company, taking its ownership to approximately 89% of the outstanding shares.

In April 2017, many supermarkets had to recall the company's hummus because of poor quality control.

In November 2017 the company floated on the London Stock Exchange, in their initial public offering.

Bakkvor aquired Blueberry Foods of Leicester, UK in 2019, a dessert manufacturer. In 2022, Ágúst Guðmundsson stepped down as CEO and appointed Mike Edwards as its successor.

Operations 
The company produces a range of meals, salads, desserts, dips, sauces, sandwiches and pizza and bread products. Bakkavor produces over 3,200 product categories to over 900 supplies in the UK, USA and China.

Bakkavor operates 23 factories in the UK, 9 in the USA and 5 in China.

References

External links
Official site

British companies established in 1986
Convenience food companies
Food and drink companies established in 1986
Food manufacturers based in London
Seafood companies of the United Kingdom
1986 establishments in England
Companies listed on the London Stock Exchange
Fish processing companies